The 2016 Spanish Indoor Athletics Championships was the 52nd edition of the annual indoor track and field competition organised by the Royal Spanish Athletics Federation (RFEA), which serves as the Spanish national indoor championship for the sport. A total of 26 events (divided evenly between the sexes) were contested over two days on 5 and 6 March at the Centro Deportivo Municipal Gallur in Madrid, Community of Madrid.

Results

Men

Women

References

Results
LII Campeonato de España Absoluto en Pista Cubierta . RFEA. Retrieved 2020-03-11.

External links
Official website for the Royal Spanish Athletics Federation

Spanish Indoor Athletics Championships
Spanish Indoor Athletics Championships
Spanish Indoor Athletics Championships
Spanish Indoor Athletics Championships
Sports competitions in Madrid